Boturići may refer to:

Boturići, Montenegro
Boturići, Serbia